The 2016 Girls' Youth NORCECA Volleyball Championship was the tenth edition of the bi-annual volleyball tournament. It was held in San Juan, Puerto Rico from 2 to 7 September among eight countries. The Dominican Republic won the tournament and qualified for the 2017 FIVB Girls' World Championship along with the United States. Dominican Republic player Natalia Martínez won the Most Valuable Player award.

Pool composition

Pool standing procedure
 Number of matches won
 Match points
 Points ratio
 Sets ratio
 Result of the last match between the tied teams

Match won 3–0: 5 match points for the winner, 0 match points for the loser
Match won 3–1: 4 match points for the winner, 1 match point for the loser
Match won 3–2: 3 match points for the winner, 2 match points for the loser

Preliminary round
All times are in Eastern Daylight Time

Group A

Group B

Final round

Bracket

Quarterfinals

5th–8th Classification

Semifinals

7th place

5th place

3rd place

Final

Finals standing

Individual awards

Most Valuable Player

Best Setter

Best Opposite

Best Outside Hitters

Best Middle Blockers

Best Libero

Best Digger

Best Receiver

Best Server

Best Scorer

References
 NORCECA

Women's NORCECA Volleyball Championship
NORCECA
2016 in Puerto Rican sports
2016 in women's volleyball
Volleyball
September 2016 sports events in North America
Sports in San Juan, Puerto Rico